Songs from a Parent to a Child is the eighth solo studio album by Art Garfunkel and his first new studio release since Lefty nine years earlier. Released as a concept album in 1997, it features his son, wife and a host of celebrity musicians, and was built on the concept of children's songs. The cover photograph was taken by Douglas Foulke on Bow Bridge, Central Park, New York City. The album received a Grammy nomination for Best Musical Album for Children.

Track listing 
 "Who's Gonna Shoe Your Pretty Little Feet?" (Traditional) - 1:51
 "Morning Has Broken" (Eleanor Farjeon) - 2:53
 "Daydream" (John Sebastian) - 2:44
 "Baby Mine" (Ned Washington, Frank Churchill) - 3:39
 "Secret O' Life" (James Taylor) – 3:36
 "The Things We've Handed Down" (Marc Cohn) - 4:37
 "You're A Wonderful One" (Holland–Dozier–Holland) - 3:12
 "Good Luck Charm" (Aaron Schroeder, Wally Gold) - 2:26
 "I Will" (John Lennon, Paul McCartney) – 2:17
 "Lasso The Moon" (Billy Simon, Lowell Alexander) - 3:28
 "Dreamland" (Mary Chapin Carpenter) - 3:10
 "Who's Gonna Shoe Your Pretty Little Feet? (Reprise)" (Traditional) - 1:41
 "The Lord's Prayer / Now I Lay Me Down to Sleep" (Albert Hay Malotte/Traditional) - 3:52

Personnel
 Art Garfunkel – vocals
 James Garfunkel, Kim Garfunkel, Merry Clayton, Maxine Waters, Julia Tillman Waters – backing vocals
 Steve Gadd, Bill Maxwell, Russ Kunkel, Chris Parker – drums
 Lee Sklar, Mark Egan, Freddie Washington – bass guitar
 Warren Bernhardt – piano, Fender Rhodes, Hammond organ B3
 Eric Weissberg – dobro, acoustic guitar, banjo, mandolin
 Billy Preston – piano, Hammond organ
 John Sebastian - guitar, harmonica, whistling
 Paulinho da Costa, Raphael Padilla – percussion
 Dean Parks, Tony Maiden, Stuart Breed – guitar
 Oscar Brashear – trumpet
 Curtis Amy – tenor saxophone
 Bob McChesney – trombone
 Jeff Mironov – electric guitar
 Dan Higgins, Lisa Edelstein – flute
 Joseph Stone – oboe, English horn
 Jimmy Webb – piano, Fender Rhodes, Hammond organ

Notes

1997 albums
Art Garfunkel albums
Albums produced by Art Garfunkel
Columbia Records albums